

246001–246100 

|-bgcolor=#f2f2f2
| colspan=4 align=center | 
|}

246101–246200 

|-id=132
| 246132 Lugyny ||  || Lugyny, a district in northern Ukraine, 110 km from Chernobyl and location of the Lugyny Youth Centre || 
|-id=153
| 246153 Waltermaria ||  || Walter E. B. Mazzucato (1921–2003) and Maria L. Pozzi (1927–2003), parents of Italian co-discoverer Michele Mazzucato || 
|-id=164
| 246164 Zdvyzhensk ||  || Brusyliv (Zdvyzhensk), the ancient town in Ukraine and birthplace of Ilarion Ohienko || 
|-id=167
| 246167 Joskohn ||  || Jos Kohn (born 1988) studied physics at the university of Fribourg, Switzerland. He promotes astronomy to more than 600 adults and children throughout the country per year and is also a member of the observatory of Ependes, where he performs astronomy experiments with students. || 
|-id=171
| 246171 Konrad ||  || Konrad König (born 2005), the first-born son of Agathe Schmid-König and astronomer Michael König, who discovered this minor planet || 
|}

246201–246300 

|-id=238
| 246238 Crampton ||  || David Crampton (born 1942) has overseen the development of exceptionally efficient, multiplexed spectrographs for CFHT and Gemini. Using them he helped establish Canadian excellence in observational cosmology. He has also excelled in research on Galactic structure and multiple stars, including X-ray binaries. || 
|-id=247
| 246247 Sheldoncooper ||  || Sheldon Cooper, a fictional character in the television series The Big Bang Theory, portrayed by actor Jim Parsons (born 1973) || 
|}

246301–246400 

|-id=345
| 246345 Carolharris ||  || Carol E. Harris (born 1940), Professor Emeritus at the University of Victoria. || 
|}

246401–246500 

|-bgcolor=#f2f2f2
| colspan=4 align=center | 
|}

246501–246600 

|-id=504
| 246504 Hualien ||  || Hualien County is the largest county in Taiwan in terms of area, and is located on the mountainous eastern coast of Taiwan. || 
|}

246601–246700 

|-id=643
| 246643 Miaoli ||  || Miaoli, a city located in the mountainous terrain on the western coastline of Taiwan. || 
|}

246701–246800 

|-id=759
| 246759 Elviracheca ||  || Elvira Checa Peña (born 1958), a chef at the Spanish Calar Alto Observatory during 2008–2014 || 
|-id=789
| 246789 Pattinson ||  || Robert Douglas Thomas Pattinson (born 1986), an English actor and musician. || 
|}

246801–246900 

|-id=821
| 246821 Satyarthi ||  || Kailash Satyarthi (born 1954), an Indian electrical engineer who received the 2014 Nobel Peace Prize for his advocacy of children's rights and education and for his fight against child labor. || 
|-id=837
| 246837 Bethfabinsky ||  || Beth Fabinsky (born 1971), an American engineer who specializes in mission operations for NASA spacecraft. || 
|-id=841
| 246841 Williamirace ||  || William Irace (born 1941) is an engineer who worked on the Viking Mars orbiters, the InfraRed Astronomical Satellite, the W. M. Keck Ten MeterTelescopes and the Spitzer Space Telescope. || 
|-id=842
| 246842 Dutchstapelbroek ||  || Maryn "Dutch" Stapelbroek (born 1947), a physicist specializing in infrared and visible light-detector design and construction. || 
|-id=861
| 246861 Johnelwell ||  || John Elwell (born 1958), an expert in the design, construction and calibration of infrared instrumentation for space-based missions to study astrophysics and the Earth's atmosphere. || 
|}

246901–247000 

|-id=913
| 246913 Slocum ||  || Joshua Slocum (1844 – c. 1909) was the first person to circumnavigate the world alone. || 
|}

References 

246001-247000